Kuju may refer to:
 Kuju, Ramgarh, a town in Ramgarh district, Jharkhand, India
 Kuju, Ardabil, a town in Iran
 Kujū, Ōita, a town in Ōita Prefecture, Japan
 Mount Kujū, a mountain in Kyushu Island, Japan
 Kuju Castle, a military fortress from the Goryeo period, in Kusong, North Korea
 Kuju Entertainment, a video game company

People with the name
 Kuju Mai, title character of Mai, the Psychic Girl